The 2018 West Georgia Wolves football team will represent the University of West Georgia in the 2018 NCAA Division II football season. They will be led by second-year head coach David Dean. The Wolves will play their home games at University Stadium and were members of the Gulf South Conference.

Schedule
West Georgia 2018 football schedule consists of six home and five away games in the regular season. The Wolves will host GSC foes Florida Tech, West Alabama, Delta State, and North Greenville, and will travel to Mississippi College, and Shorter, Valdosta State, and West Florida.

The Wolves will host two of the three non-conference games against Catawba from the South Atlantic Conference (SAC) and Limestone also from SAC and will travel to Albany State from the Southern Intercollegiate Athletic Conference.

Two of the eleven games will be broadcast on ESPN3, as part of the Gulf South Conference Game of the Week.

Schedule Source:

Rankings

Game summaries

Catawba

Limestone

at Albany State

Florida Tech

at Shorter

North Greenville

at West Florida

West Alabama

at Mississippi College

Delta State

at Valdosta State

Wingate

References

West Georgia
West Georgia Wolves football seasons
West Georgia Wolves football